Nyazepetrovsky District is an administrative and municipal district (raion), one of the twenty-seven in Chelyabinsk Oblast, Russia. It is located in the northwest of the oblast. Its administrative center is the town of Nyazepetrovsk. Population:  21,527 (2002 Census);  The population of Nyazepetrovsk accounts for 68.2% of the district's total population.

References

Notes

Sources

Districts of Chelyabinsk Oblast